"One in a Million" is a song by Canadian pop-rap band Down with Webster. It was the first single from their third album Party for Your Life. The song was released on March 20, 2013, and certified platinum in December 2013.

Music video
The music video for "One in a Million" was released on May 5, 2013, and directed by Aaron A. The music video features the band playing in front of a slideshow screen and throughout the song they are seen wearing glow in the dark suits. The song was nominated for "Pop Video of the Year" at the 2013 MuchMusic Video Awards.

Chart performance
"One in a Million" entered the Canadian Hot 100 chart at number 57 and peaked at number 27. In addition, the song also peaked at number 12 on Canada CHR/Top 40 and number 22 on Canada Hot AC.

Charts

Weekly charts

Year-end charts

Certifications

References

2013 songs
Down with Webster songs